Routa is a village in Kendrapara district, Odisha state, India.

References

Villages in Kendrapara district